Ben Sures (born December 29, 1967) is a Canadian roots musician who was a contributor to CBC Radio's The Irrelevant Show.

He is the son of Order of Canada-winning ceramic artist Jack Sures and painter and illustrator Deborah Uman-Sures.

A mostly-self-taught musician, Sures discovered the music of Robert Johnson at age 15 and devoted himself to the study of blues and roots.

He spent close to a decade as an itinerant street musician and more than 20 years touring the Canadian coffee house and festival circuit both as a solo headliner and as a sideman for blues musicians such as Harp Dog Brown, Rita Chiarelli and Paul Reddick. During that time, he developed a distinctive, quirky songwriting style marked by plain-spoken lyrics that often express unique takes on unusual topics.

He won the folk category of the 2005 John Lennon Song Competition with "Any Precious Girl, a compassionate-yet-unpatronizing song about a young woman with bipolar disorder.

His album, Gone to Bolivia made Now's Best of the Year lists in 2011, and contained the song "Columbus Sailed Here", in which Sures observes the transformation of third-world countries due to cruise ship tourism. Other notable examples of Sures' style are found on "High School Steps", on which he performs a tribute to Ray Davies of the Kinks by reflecting on the life of high school musicians who saw Davies as their idol.

Sures was the resident musician on CBC Radio's The Irrelevant Show.

His side projects include The Death Ballad Love Tellers, a song circle with fellow underground folk singers David P. Smith and Buba Uno, in which the performers challenge themselves to write murder ballads and perform them on stage.
  
Discography
1995 – No Absolutes1997 – Ooh Wah Baby2001 – Live: Keep Fresh2003 – Goodbye Pretty Girl2008 – Field Guide to Loneliness2011 – Gone to Bolivia2013 – Son of Trouble''

References

1967 births
Living people
Canadian male singers
Canadian folk singers
Canadian blues singers
Canadian comedy musicians
Canadian songwriters